Nicholas P. Samios (born March 15, 1932 in NYC) is an American physicist and former director of the Brookhaven National Laboratory in Upton, New York.

Biography
He majored in physics at Columbia College of Columbia University, from which he graduated in 1953; he earned his PhD at Columbia in 1957. He worked on the Columbia faculty for three years before joining Brookhaven's physics department, where he was appointed laboratory director in May 1982. A major achievement of his tenure was the construction of the RHIC, the first heavy-ion collider. He stepped down as director in 1997 after a dispute on leaked radioactivity in the laboratory, but continued to work as a researcher. In 2003 he became director of the RIKEN BNL Research Center.

Scientific achievements
Samios has specialized  in the physics of high-energy particles. He is especially known for his study of elementary particles, in particular for the discovery of the Omega minus particle in 1964 as postulated by Murray Gell-Mann and Yuval Ne'eman, as well as the first charmed baryon. These discoveries have contributed to the understanding of the spectrum of particles and have carried to the formulation of Quantum Chromodynamics and the Standard Model of particle physics.

Awards 
1980 Ernest Orlando Lawrence Award
1982 Member of the National Academy of Sciences
1993 Panofsky Prize
2009 Gian Carlo Wick Gold Medal

References

Further reading
 450th Brookhaven Lecture: Nicholas Samios to Reflect on Science
 Articles by Nicholas P. Samios on Scientific American

1932 births
Living people
21st-century American physicists
Brookhaven National Laboratory staff
Columbia College (New York) alumni
Columbia University faculty
Fellows of the American Association for the Advancement of Science
Members of the United States National Academy of Sciences
Winners of the Panofsky Prize
Fellows of the American Physical Society